The history of the Jews in Honduras begins in the colonial period, during the proceedings of the Inquisition with the arrival of sephardic Jews to Honduran soil. As of April 2020, in Honduras there are 390 Jews who have gained the Honduran residence. Honduran Jews are able to practice Judaism peacefully and are included in Honduran politics and culture. The Jewish community is primarily concentrated in Tegucigalpa and San Pedro Sula, where there are synagogues. Honduras was one of the first countries to recognize the State of Israel, in 1948, and the Jewish community in Honduras has benefited greatly from Israeli aid.

History

The Arrival of Jews in Honduras

Sephardic Jews crossed the Atlantic Ocean on Spanish ships. They first became settlers, then Officials of the Crown, sailors, merchants, and other professionals. Their vision was to reach a piece of land to call home, first in Seville, then in the Spanish viceroyalties. The municipality of Trinidad in the Department of Santa Bárbara has deep Jewish historical roots and is related to Jewish society. There are many other municipalities that share these foundational roots, but they are more Christianized.

When the Province of Honduras was founded and the city of Comayagua was designated as its capital, several Jews settled there. They were distributed throughout the Honduran territory as it grew in commercial importance, as a policy between the seventeenth and nineteenth centuries. Honduras was under the conservative administration of Captain-General José María Medina when the National Congress issued an Immigration Law on February 26, 1866. This law gave all foreigners who wanted to reside in the country access. The Political Constitution of 1876 also reflected the importance of immigration in the national territory.

20th century 
Between 1875 and 1915 (before World War I) 45 million Europeans crossed the Atlantic in search of better living conditions on the American continent. In total, 2,500,000 of these Europeans were Jews.

The First World War led many Jewish merchants and financiers to take their fortunes out of Europe, with some moving to the United States and Latin American countries (mainly the Southern Cone) and others to Russia.

In the case of Honduras, the arrival of European Jews began in full swing in 1920. Between 1920 and 1940, the majority of Jews who arrived in the country were Ashkenazis of German, Polish and Romanian origin fleeing Europe due to the onset of the Second World War. Many of these immigrated in 1939, when a total of 455 Germans were registered in Honduras, 95 of whom were Jewish. The following year, a decree was issued during the administration of Doctor Vicente Mejía Colindres in which the Immigration Office was created and attached to the Ministry of the Interior. Colindres also oversaw the passage of a law that authorized foreigners of Arab, Chinese, Turkish, Syrian, Armenian, Palestinian, and African ethnicity, as well as individuals called Colies, to immigrate to Honduras, provided that they bring 5,000 Silver Pesos and that they would make a deposit to the state coffers of 500 Silver Pesos per person within two months of arrival in the country. 25 Jewish citizens were naturalized between 1946 and 1956, 19 of which were Poles, which was equivalent to 76% of the naturalizations completed.

The president of Honduras allowed the entry of Jews during World War II, with the influence of the local Jewish community. In 1950 there were 40 Jewish families in Honduras. After the Second World War there was a brief boom in the community thanks to the arrival of dozens of new immigrants, but at the beginning of the 1950s most of them would emigrate to the south of the continent to Argentina and Chile where their governments were more inclined to receive Jews.

At the end of the 20th century during the government of Rafael Leonardo Callejas, more than a third of the Jews living in Honduras would leave for Israel, the United States, or Argentina due to the financial crisis in the country, depriving the country's Jewish population of much of its youth community. On 3 August 1997, the community in San Pedro Sula dedicated the Maguen David Synagogue to serve as a community center for future generations.

Present day 

With the 2009 Honduran constitutional crisis, the local Jewish community became embroiled in the controversy. Rumors spread throughout the Honduran media of Jewish and Israeli involvement in the coup d'état. A commentator on Radio Globo, David Romero Ellner, suggested on the air that perhaps it would have been better if the Jews had been exterminated in the Holocaust. His comments drew ire from ousted Honduran president Manuel Zelaya, the US Embassy in Tegucigalpa, and the Anti-Defamation League.

Juan Orlando Hernández has led a pro-Israel government since his election in 2014. Israel is one of his greatest allies and the first country to recognize him after the allegations of electoral fraud that involved Hernández's re-election led to protests and subsequent repression that caused 30 deaths.

In recent years, some Honduran Jews have made aliyah to Israel.

In 2015, Rosenthals have been implicated with longstanding corruption and other crimes. Yankel Rosenthal, a former minister of investment, was arrested on 6 October 2015 after landing at Miami airport. He, together with his cousin Yani and uncle Jaime Rolando, a newspaper owner and four-time presidential candidate, were also charged with money laundering and other services that support the international narcotics trafficking activities of multiple Central American drug traffickers and their criminal organizations. Seven of their businesses were labelled under the US Kingpin Act as "specially designated narcotics traffickers". They have been accused of transferring drug money between accounts in New York and Honduras between 2004 and 2015.

Judaism in Honduras 

There are two Jewish congregations in Honduras, one located in Tegucigalpa and the other in San Pedro Sula. The first synagogue in Honduras, the Shevit Ajim Synagogue, was built in 1997 in Tegucigalpa. However, it was destroyed in 1998 by Hurricane Mitch, and rebuilt in 2002 with international aid. The other synagogue in Honduras is the Maguen David Synagogue, located in San Pedro Sula. There are no Jewish day schools in Honduras, but educational activities like Jewish Sunday school and Talmud Torah classes are generally available in Tegucigalpa.

Notable Honduran Jews 
Many Honduran Jews have made contributions to society in fields such as politics, journalism, business, and medicine.

 Boris Goldstein: donated land for Maguen David Synagogue.
 Jacobo Goldstein: journalist, businessman.
 Ricardo Maduro Joest: Politician, Honduran ex-president.
 Martin Baide Urmeneta: lawyer, journalist politician..
 Jaime Rosenthal: businessman, politician.
 Yani Rosenthal: politician
 Yankel Rosenthal: C.D. Marathón president.

Jewish Surnames in Honduras 
In Honduras, the following Central European surnames are Ashkenazi Jewish; Hispanic surnames appear related to certain local populations of Hispanic Jewish origin. Apart from this, in general they did not start in Jewish families, and if that were the case, a genealogical investigation is necessary to determine if the name was inherited from them or from their slaves or indigenous people sponsored by them.

Sephardic

Azhkhenazim 
 Rosenthal
 Starkman
 Seidel
 Goldstein
 Silverstein.

See also

List of Honduran Jews
Crypto-Judaism
History of the Jews in Latin America
List of Latin American Jews
Arab immigration to Honduras
Italian migration to Honduras
Spanish migration to Honduras

Footnotes

References

External links
Comunidad Judia de Honduras

Jewish
Honduran
Honduran
History